The 2016 United States House of Representatives elections in Iowa were held on November 8, 2016, to elect the four U.S. representatives from the state of Iowa, one from each of the state's four congressional districts. The elections coincided with the 2016 U.S. presidential election, as well as other elections to the House of Representatives, elections to the United States Senate and various state and local elections. The primaries were held on June 7.

District 1

Republican Rod Blum won this seat in 2014, following Democrat Bruce Braley's decision to run for Senate.

Democratic primary

Candidates
Declared
Pat Murphy, former Speaker of the Iowa House of Representatives and nominee for this seat in 2014
Monica Vernon, Cedar Rapids City Councilwoman, candidate for the seat in 2014 and nominee for Lieutenant Governor of Iowa in 2014

Withdrew
Ravi Patel, president of Hawkeye Hotels
Gary Kroeger, advertising executive and former actor

Declined
Chet Culver, former governor of Iowa
Swati Dandekar, former member of the Iowa Utilities Board, former state senator and candidate for the seat in 2014
Anesa Kajtazovic, former state representative and candidate for the seat in 2014
Dave O'Brien, attorney, nominee for IA-06 in 1988 and candidate for this seat in 2014

Endorsements

Results

Republican primary
Incumbent Rod Blum ran for re-election to a second term and was unopposed in the primary.

Results

General election

Polling

Results

District 2

Democratic Representative Dave Loebsack had represented Iowa's 2nd district since 2007.  He was elected to a fifth term in 2014 against Republican Mariannette Miller-Meeks with 53% of the vote.

Democratic primary

Incumbent Dave Loebsack ran for re-election to a sixth term in office and was unopposed in the primary.

Results

Republican primary

Coralville thoracic surgeon Christopher Peters ran as a Republican and was unopposed in the primary.

Republican state senator Mark Chelgren considered running, but ultimately declined.

Results

General election

Results

District 3

Republican David Young was elected to a first term in 2014 against Democrat Staci Appel with 53% of the vote.

Democratic primary

Candidates
Declared
 Desmund Adams, executive recruiting firm owner and 2012 State Senate candidate
 Jim Mowrer, vice chair of the Iowa Democratic Party, former special assistant to the United States Under Secretary of the Army, and nominee for IA-04 in 2014
 Mike Sherzan, businessman from West Des Moines

Declined
 Staci Appel, former state senator and nominee in 2014
 Nathan Blake, Des Moines School Board member, Assistant Iowa Attorney General and 2014 State Senate candidate
 Chet Culver, former governor
 Mike Sherzan, businessman and candidate in 2014
 Nick Klinefeldt, United States Attorney for the Southern District of Iowa
 Matt McCoy, state senator

Results

Republican primary
David Young ran for re-election to a second term in office.

Candidates
Declared
 Joe Grandanette, retired teacher and candidate for the seat in 2014
 David Young, incumbent U.S. Representative

Declined
 Brad Zaun, state senator and candidate for the seat in 2010 and 2014

Results

General election

Polling
{| class="wikitable"
|- valign= bottom
! Poll source
! Date(s)administered
! Samplesize
! Margin oferror
! style="width:100px;"| DavidYoung (R)
! style="width:100px;"| JimMowrer (D)
! Undecided
|-
| GQR Research (D-DCCC)
| align=center| October 2016
| align=center| 400
| align=center| ± 4.9%
|  align=center| 49%
| align=center| 46%
| align=center| 3%
|-
| Loras College 
| align=center| September 20–22, 2016
| align=center| 327
| align=center| ± 5.4%
|  align=center| 46%
| align=center| 36%
| align=center| 15%
|-
| The Tarrance Group (R-Young)
| align=center| September 20–22, 2016
| align=center| 400
| align=center| ± 4.9%
|  align=center| 52%
| align=center| 37%
| align=center| 11%
|-
| RABA Research
| align=center| September 6–8, 2016
| align=center| 303
| align=center| ± 5.6%
|  align=center| 50%
| align=center| 35%
| align=center| 16%

Results

District 4

Republican Representative Steve King won re-election in the 4th district in 2014, winning with 62% over Democrat Kim Weaver.

Democratic primary

Kim Weaver, chair of the O'Brien County Democrats and a local AFSCME official, challenged King in the general election and was unopposed in the primary.

Results

Republican primary

Incumbent Steve King ran for re-election.

Republican state senator Rick Bertrand challenged King in the primary for the Republican nomination.

Results

General election

Results

References

External links
U.S. House elections in Iowa, 2016 at Ballotpedia
Campaign contributions at OpenSecrets

House
Iowa
2016